17th Ali ibn Abi Taleb Division was a division of the Islamic Revolutionary Guard Corps during the Iran–Iraq War. It covered Qom, Zanjan, Semnan, and Markazi provinces.

After Operation Tariq-ol-Qods, the 17th Brigade of Qom was established in the Shush area. Fighters were from Qom, Mashhad, Behbahan, and Shush. Its commander was initially Morteza Saffari, who later became the deputy of Fajr Headquarters and was replaced by Hassan Darvish. In July or August 1982, the brigade was renamed to 17th Ali ibn Abi Taleb Brigade. Since then, forces from Zanjan, Semnan, Markazi provinces constituted the bulk of the unit. In the fourth phase of the Operation Ramadan, Mehdi Zeinoddin was appointed as the new commander of the brigade. After Operation Muharram and the expansion of IRGC brigades, this unit was expanded to the 17th Ali ibn Abi Taleb Division. The division proved to be capable during the war. It played a major role in the initial successful stages of Operation Badr. From November 1984 to May 1988, Gholamreza Jaafari was its commander, after whom Mohammad Mirjani commanded the unit for two months. After Operation Dawn 10, commander of IRGC Ground Forces Ali Shamkhani separated and expanded the division into 17th Ali ibn Abi Taleb Division and a new 71st Roohollah Division of Markazi Province. 12th Qaem Brigade of Semnan and Saheb-ol-Amr Brigade of Zanjan were also later separated as new units.

Sepah-e Ali bin Abu Taleb 
The division was merged with the Basij of Qom Province to form the Imam Ali ibn Abi Talib Corps of Qom Province during the rearrangement of the IRGC units in 2008.

See also
 15th Imam Hassan Brigade

References

External links
 لشکر 17 علی بن ابیطالب(ع) در عملیات بدر (in Persian)

Military units and formations of Army of the Guardians of the Islamic Revolution
Qom Province
Zanjan Province
Semnan Province
Markazi Province